SNL Studios (also known as "Saturday Night Live Studios") is a production company founded in 1997 as a joint venture between Saturday Night Live creator and producer Lorne Michaels and NBC Studios. While this venture also initially included Paramount Pictures in which was also part of the venture, it was their part and was dissolved in 2004 following NBC's merger with Universal Studios to form NBCUniversal. SNL Studios produces Saturday Night Live in association with Broadway Video (also founded by Lorne Michaels), as well as produce movies, mainly featuring Saturday Night Live sketch characters, A Night at the Roxbury, Superstar and The Ladies Man.

Following the announcement of the creation of SNL Studios, veteran Saturday Night Live producer Marci Klein was named as the president of SNL Studios Television in 1999, while Richard Feldman was appointed head of SNL Studios Films in June of the same year. No on-screen logo was used until 1999.

Productions

References

Film production companies of the United States
Saturday Night Live
Mass media companies established in 1997
Television production companies of the United States